Avdeyevo is a rural locality (a village) in Zadneselskoye Rural Settlement of Ust-Kubinsky District, Vologda Oblast, Russia. The population was 3 as of 2002.

Geography 
Avdeyevo is located 14 km north of Ustye (the district's administrative centre) by road. Kikht is the nearest rural locality.

References 

Rural localities in Ust-Kubinsky District